William Murdoch Morrison (1875 – 3 August 1956) was the founder of the business which would, after his death, become the Morrisons supermarket chain.

Career
Brought up in Bradford, West Yorkshire, William Morrison started selling eggs and butter on a wholesale basis in 1899. Shortly afterwards he opened a stall in Bradford and then others in nearby towns. He opened his first proper stores in the 1920s - but still only in the Bradford area. This then became Morrisons.

His son Ken Morrison took over as chairman in 1956 following William's death.

References

British retail company founders
British grocers
Businesspeople from Bradford
1875 births
1956 deaths
English businesspeople
English people of Scottish descent